The Oste is a German river. 

Oste may also refer to:

 Oste-class fleet service ship, a German Navy class
 German auxiliary Oste, a ship of the class 
 Off-stoichiometry thiol-enes (OSTE), in chemistry - see off-stoichiometry thiol-ene polymer

People
 Ostenus or Oste I, one of the legendary kings of Sweden, according to Johannes Magnus - see List of legendary kings of Sweden
 Oste Erceg (born 1947), Bosnian Serb painter
 Daniel Droste (born 1980), German musician and singer also known as Dr. Oste
Oste (surname)

Fictional characters
 L'oste, a character in the novel The Adventures of Pinocchio

See also
 Osti (disambiguation)
 Osty, a surname